Terellia winthemi is a species of tephritid or fruit flies in the genus Terellia of the family Tephritidae.

Distribution
North Europe & West Siberia South to France, Albania, Ukraine & Kazakhstan.

References

Tephritinae
Insects described in 1826
Diptera of Europe
Diptera of Asia